Laura L. Lenderman is a United States Air Force Major General who serves as the director of operations of the United States Transportation Command. She previously served as the director of operations, strategic deterrence, and nuclear integration of the Air Mobility Command.

Military career 
In 2022, Lenderman was assigned to replace Major General Corey Martin as director of operations of the United States Transportation Command.

Dates of rank

References

External links

Year of birth missing (living people)
Living people
Place of birth missing (living people)
United States Air Force generals